Glucosaminephosphate isomerase may refer to:

 Glutamine—fructose-6-phosphate transaminase (isomerizing), an enzyme
 Glucosamine-6-phosphate deaminase, an enzyme